The Changheba Dam is a concrete rock-filled embankment dam on the Dadu River near Kangding in Sichuan Province, China. Initial construction on the dam began in 2006, before it was officially approved in December 2010 and impounded in 2016. Its power station was fully operational in December 2017. In July 2009, a landslide at the construction site killed four people while causing damage and temporarily blocking the river.

See also 

 List of power stations in China
 List of dams and reservoirs in China

References

Hydroelectric power stations in Sichuan
Dams in China
Concrete-face rock-fill dams
Dams on the Dadu River
Dams completed in 2016
Energy infrastructure completed in 2017